Davide Chicco (born 11 July 1973) is an Italian male mountain runner, who won a medal at individual senior level  at the World Mountain Running Championships.

See also
 Italy at the World Mountain Running Championships
 Italy at the European Mountain Running Championships

References

External links
 
 
 Davide Chicco at FIDAL 

1973 births
Living people
Italian male long-distance runners
Italian male mountain runners
Sportspeople from Como
21st-century Italian people